The Tulu Moye Geothermal Power Station, is a  geothermal power station, under construction in Ethiopia. When fully developed, the power station will be the first grid-ready independently developed geothermal power station in the country. The developers of this power plant, plan to expand it to 150 megawatts capacity, in the second phase, planned in the following five years.

Location
The concession site comprises .

Overview
The power station will be developed in phases. The first phase involves drilling of 12 holes, two of which are injection holes, while the remaining ten are production holes. The next infrastructure is the construction of a steam collection and injection system. The addition of a "water-cooled condensing steam plant" comes after that.

Developers
The power station is under development by Tulu Moye Geothermal Operations Private Limited Company (TMGO), a special-purpose company registered in Ethiopia. In turn, TMGO is 100 percent owned by Tulu Moye SAS, a company registered in France, whose shareholding is illustrated in the table below.

Funding
The cost of construction of the first phase of this infrastructure project (the first 50 megawatts) is budgeted at US$260 million, borne by the developers; 25 percent as equity and 75 percent as debt.

Construction
In October 2019, the drilling contract was awarded to Kenya Electricity Generating Company (Kengen), a company from neighboring Kenya. The drilling contract price is quoted as US$52 million for eight wells; at $6.5 million per geothermal well.

See also

List of power stations in Ethiopia 
Corbetti Geothermal Power Station
Energy in Ethiopia

References

External links
 Tulu Moye, Ethiopia Geothermal Project
 The Rise of East Africa As An Alternative Energy Mecca

Geothermal power stations in Ethiopia
Renewable energy power stations in Ethiopia
Oromia Region